Severe Tropical Cyclone Ami was one of the worst cyclones to affect Fiji. The system was the third cyclone and the second severe tropical cyclone of the 2002–03 South Pacific cyclone season. Cyclone Ami developed from a low-pressure area east of Tuvalu on January 12. Originally, the storm moved slowly towards the southwest early in its existence. Influenced by an upper-level trough, Ami slowed and began moving towards the south and then southeast. The cyclone attained severe tropical cyclone intensity on January 13. Ami made its first landfall at Vanua Levu, before subsequently making another landfall on Taveuni. Still intensifying, Ami reached peak intensity as an equivalent Category 3 cyclone on the Australian and Fiji cyclone scales on January 14. Accelerating to the southeast, the cyclone began to cross over cool sea surface temperatures and encountered wind shear. Ami transitioned into an extratropical cyclone the day after.

Cyclone Ami severely impacted areas of Fiji, primarily causing flooding. Numerous landslides and power outages resulted from the heavy rains. Damage was particularly severe in Labasa, Fiji, where floodwater inundated the entire city. Damage sustained to crops was also severe, especially the sugar cane, where production decreased by 15% due to Ami. In Tonga, damage was not as severe. However, two ships offshore were grounded due to the cyclone. Ami caused F$104.4 million (US$51.2 million) in damages and 17 deaths, primarily on Fiji. Following the deaths and damage, the name "Ami" was later retired.

Meteorological history

Over the next two days as the system moved towards the southwest further development of the depression was inhibited by strong vertical windshear, before during January 11, the vertical windshear decreased and the system started to rapidly develop further. As it developed further the United States Joint Typhoon Warning Center issued a tropical cyclone formation alert on the system, before they designated it as Tropical Cyclone 10P later that day as the 1-minute sustained windspeeds became equivalent to a tropical storm. RSMC Nadi subsequently reported six hours later that the depression had developed into a category one tropical cyclone on the Australian tropical cyclone intensity scale, and named it as Ami, while it was located just to the east of the southern Tuvalu island of Niulakita.

Tracking southwest, the storm was named Tropical Cyclone Ami at approximately 0000 UTC on January 12 under favorable upper-level diffluence facilitated by the nearby ridge of high pressure. Influenced by an upper-level trough, Ami slowed in forward movement and turned on a more southerly course. With minimal wind shear and a good outflow pattern, Ami achieved severe tropical cyclone intensity at 0600 UTC on January 13. The cyclone made landfall on Vanua Levu with a minimum barometric pressure of 960 mbar (28.4 inHg) before subsequently crossing the western tip of Taveuni. Broadly turning toward the southeast, Ami traversed the Lau Islands.

Accelerating toward the southeast with forward speed reaching , Ami began to gradually weaken due to resuming wind shear and increasingly cool waters. The cyclone interacted with a frontal boundary, and in doing so it transitioned to an extratropical cyclone. Ami lost all tropical characteristics by 1200 UTC on January 15, although its remnants continued eastward to a point well south of Rarotonga. On January 14, RSMC Nadi issued their final advisory on Ami and passed the primary warning responsibility for Cyclone Ami to the Wellington Tropical Cyclone Warning Center (TCWC Wellington) as the system moved below 25 °S.

Preparations and impact

Fiji

Prior to the storm, 30 evacuation shelters were opened. On Lavau Island, residents took shelter in limestone caves to avoid the oncoming storm surge.

After the storm, major damage was recorded to houses, crops, schools across Fiji. Heavy rainfall led to landslides and intensive flooding, and combined with storm surges to give rise to dangerous flash floods. Due to the rugged terrain of the island, the rains resulted in heavy flooding. Power lines were cut off in Vanua Levu, Taveuni, and the Lau Islands, resulting in widespread power outage. In Vanua Levu, damage to crops and bush material were reported. The island was also damaged by strong tidal swells and storm surge. Communications with the island were cut off at approximately 1700 UTC, preventing damage reports from being communicated for a period of time. Labasa, Fiji was inundated under  of water. The city's morgue could not operate due to damage sustained by Ami. As a result, bodies found in the area had to be cremated. An entire family was reported to have drowned after their house was inundated by rising floodwater. Two children went missing an others were injured when a wooden church on Druadrua Island being used as a shelter collapsed. However, the two children were later found alive in the debris. St. Bede's College in Savusavu was severely damaged by Ami.

Across much of the islands, agricultural damage was widespread. Primarily due to damages sustained on the Fiji Sugar Corporation sugar mill in Labasa, sugar cane production in 2003 dropped by 800,000 tonnes (882,000 short tons), equivalent to 15% less than forecast. Coconut plantations also sustained heavy damages. In Lau Province and Lomaiviti Province, an estimated 158 houses were completely destroyed. In the two provinces, damages totaled to F$4.5 million (US$2.2 million). However, in Macuata, Cakaudrove, and Bua provinces, 2,287 houses were destroyed. In those three provinces, damages were estimated to be F$23.7 million (US$11.6 million).

After Fiji cut water supplies, residents feared that the water would be contaminated with disease and other chemicals. As a result of Ami, F$104.4 million (US$51.2 million) in damages resulted from the cyclone, and 14 people died.

Tonga
In Tonga, no significant damage was reported, although minor power outages occurred on some islands. Damage to fruit trees accounted for most of the damage on Tonga. Offshore, however, two ships were grounded, including the Olovaha ferry offshore of Popua Beach, but no fatalities were reported.

Aftermath
A P-3 Orion was sent from New Zealand to investigate the damage caused by Cyclone Ami, departing from Whenuapai. 150 soldiers from the Republic of Fiji Military Forces were on standby in Suva in preparation for sending equipment to affected areas. Fijian patrol boats carrying emergency supplies were also headed for affected regions to provide medical and shelter equipment. The Fiji Red Cross Society (FRCS) provided assistance and emergency supplies to at least 2,000 families affected by the storm. The FRCS focused on provided victims items such as clothing, cooking utensils, and towels. In addition, the World Bank proposed disaster mitigation and adaptation to help reduce flood impact in Fiji. After the cyclone, Vanua Levu was declared a state of emergency (by the Fijian government)  and a disaster area.
The Cabinet of Fiji later met in Suva, Fiji in order to change the national budget to allocate relief and reconstruction funds.

See also

Cyclone Raja
Wettest tropical cyclones in Fiji
Geography of Fiji

References

Notes

External links

Retired South Pacific cyclones
Tropical cyclones in Fiji
Category 3 South Pacific cyclones
Tropical cyclones in Wallis and Futuna
Tropical cyclones in Tuvalu
2002–03 South Pacific cyclone season
2003 in Wallis and Futuna
Ami